Boodhoo is a Mauritian surname. Notable people with the name include:
 Harish Boodhoo (born 1946), Mauritian political figure 
 Isaiah James Boodhoo (1932–2004), Trinidadian painter and writer
 Niala Boodhoo, American journalist

References 

Surnames of Mauritian origin
Surnames of Trinidadian origin